The Montaña de Tindaya is a mountain in Fuerteventura, one of the Canary Islands in the Atlantic Ocean off the coast of Africa.  It was considered a sacred place by the pre-colonial local population, and is also known as the Sacred Mountain today.

The mountain is the proposed site of Monument to Tolerance, an artwork conceived by the sculptor Eduardo Chillida (1924–2002), that would involve the excavation a large artificial cave. Local environmentalists objected to the project. , construction work on the site had not started.

References

Fuerteventura
Tindaya